Trigonidium may refer to:

Trigonidium (cricket), a genus of insects in the family Gryllidae
Trigonidium (plant), a genus of plants in the family Orchidaceae